Maywood may refer to:

Places in the United States
 Maywood, California
 Maywood, Illinois
 Maywood (Metra), a commuter railroad station
 Maywood, Missouri
 Maywood, New Jersey
 Maywood Station Museum, formerly the station of Maywood
 Maywood, Nebraska
Maywood, West Virginia
 Maywood Beach, a former water park in northern Mississippi
 Ellwood H. May Environmental Park, known as Maywood Park in Sheboygan, Wisconsin

Other
 Maywood (band)
 Maywood Community School